Juxtaposition is a novel by Piers Anthony published in 1982.

Plot summary
Juxtaposition is the third novel in the series after Split Infinity and Blue Adept.

Reception
Dave Langford reviewed Juxtaposition for White Dwarf #47, and stated that "Juxtaposition is more, much more, very much more of the same stuff from the previous two, and sometimes I thought it would never end, as in a final stroke of miscalculation Anthony allows his twin worlds of magic and technology to merge in a prolonged tussle goblins, golems, tanks, power winches, unicorns, plastic explosive, magicians, cannon - which bores on into wearisome farce."

Reviews
Review by W. Ritchie Benedict (1984) in Thrust, #20, Summer 1984

References

1982 novels